Mark Nelson may refer to:
 Mark Nelson (actor) (born 1955), American theater actor, director, and acting teacher
 Mark Nelson (cricketer) (born 1986), English cricketer 
 Mark Nelson (North Dakota official), superintendent of the North Dakota Highway Patrol
 Mark Nelson (artist), artist whose work has appeared in role-playing games and comic books
 Mark Nelson (Chicago artist) (born 1957), artist who has contributed public art to the Chicago area
 Mark Nelson (boxing referee), boxing referee from Maplewood, Minnesota
 Mark Nelson (musician), musician with the band Pan American
 Mark Nelson (Canadian football) (born 1956), defensive coordinator for the Edmonton Eskimos
 Mark Nelson (offensive lineman)
 Mark Nelson (footballer) (born 1969), Scottish former footballer
 Mark Nelson (video game designer), video game designer
 Mark Nelson (scientist), American ecologist
 Mark L. Nelson, American chemist
 Mark T. Nelson, American physiologist
 Mark W. Nelson, American academic, accountant, and dean of Cornell University's Samuel Curtis Johnson Graduate School of Management